The Cholistani is a breed of domestic sheep from Punjab, Pakistan.  Though the Cholistani grows wool, it is raised primarily for meat.

Characteristics 
This breed has a black to brown head and ears with a white body.  They have stubby, small ears and are locally called 'Buchi'.  The Cholistani has a long tail.

Mature rams weigh  and ewes weigh . At birth and on average, rams weigh  and ewes weigh .

Ewes have an average litter size of 1.05 lambs.  During an average lactation cycle of 110 days, ewes produce  of milk.

From 1986 to 1996, the world population of the Cholistani decreased from 275,964 to 33,025 respectively.  In 1986, there were an average of 120 per flock and artificial insemination was not used.

References 

Livestock in Punjab
Sheep breeds
Sheep breeds originating in Pakistan